Captain Joseph Edward Lynch (born 26 April 1880 in Monkstown, County Dublin, Ireland; died 25 September 1915 in Loos, France) was an Irish cricketer. A right-handed batsman and right-arm medium-fast bowler, he played twice for the Ireland cricket team in September 1909.

His first match for Ireland was against "All New York" on Staten Island. He did not score a run in the match as Ireland won by an innings. In his second match, also his only first-class match, he played against Philadelphia, and was the tenth victim of Bart King in the Irish first innings. He did not play for Ireland again.

Lynch was a British Army officer who first commissioned into the Royal Irish Fusiliers, and during World War I rose to be a captain in the 10th West Yorkshire Regiment. He was killed during the Battle of Loos on 25 September 1915.

References
 Profile

1880 births
1915 deaths
Irish cricketers
Military personnel from Dublin (city)
Royal Irish Fusiliers officers
Green Howards officers
Irish people of World War I
British Army personnel of World War I
British military personnel killed in World War I
Cricketers from County Dublin
Gentlemen of Ireland cricketers